The men's hammer throw event at the 2016 IAAF World U20 Championships was held at Zdzisław Krzyszkowiak Stadium on 20 and 22 July.

Medalists

Records

Results

Qualification
Qualification: 72.00 (Q) or at least 12 best performers (q) qualified for the final.

Final

References

Hammer throw
Hammer throw at the World Athletics U20 Championships